Manfred Hofmann (born 30 January 1948 in Großwallstadt) is a former West German handball player who competed in the 1976 Summer Olympics.

In 1976 he was part of the West German team which finished fourth in the Olympic tournament. He played five matches as goalkeeper.

References

1948 births
Living people
West German male handball players
Olympic handball players of West Germany
Handball players at the 1976 Summer Olympics